The 2013 season of the Western Australian State League Premier Division started on 16 March between eleven clubs and the National Training Squad (NTC). The Season ended on 5 October with the Championship decider. Similar to 2012, the NTC did not play for competition points.

Stirling Lions were the Premiers – their 7th title – and Bayswater City were Champions.

Pre-season changes

League table

Finals

References 

Soccer in Western Australia
2013 in Australian soccer
2013